Hot Chili (also known as Hot Summer) is a 1985 comedy film directed by William Sachs, and co-written by Sachs with Menahem Golan (who is credited in the film as Joseph Goldman). It stars Allan Kayser, Joe Rubbo, and Taaffe O'Connell. It was filmed in Mexico.

It received a negative rating from the film site AllMovie.

Plot summary
Four adolescent youths travel to seek out employment opportunity at a resort in Mexico. The supervisor of the facility advises them to stay away from relations with the guests. However, the youngsters soon find themselves enmeshed in relationships with colorful figures that visit the facility including two older individuals from Texas that engage in the sexual practice of swinging, a dominatrix from Germany, a music instructor who becomes sexually aroused when giving lessons, and a large-breasted chef. One of the boys refrains from sexual activity and waits to find a match to engage with him emotionally and love him.

Production

Casting
Cast members include Allan Kayser, Joe Rubbo, and Louisa Moritz.

Filming
The film was directed by William Sachs. Prior to shooting Hot Chili, Sachs had directed nine films; his most recent previous film was the science fiction film Galaxina released in 1980.

Reception
AllMovie gave the film a rating of one star out of a possible five.

See also

1985 in film

References

External links
 
 
 
 

American teen comedy films
Films set in Mexico
Films shot in Mexico
Golan-Globus films
1980s teen comedy films
1985 films
Beach party films
Teen sex comedy films
1985 comedy films
Films produced by Menahem Golan
Films with screenplays by Menahem Golan
Films produced by Yoram Globus
1980s English-language films
Films directed by William Sachs
1980s American films